Ray Edwards (17 February 1927 – May 1991) was a Jamaican boxer. He competed in the men's light heavyweight event at the 1948 Summer Olympics. At the 1948 Summer Olympics, he lost to George Hunter of South Africa.

References

1927 births
1991 deaths
Light-heavyweight boxers
Jamaican male boxers
Olympic boxers of Jamaica
Boxers at the 1948 Summer Olympics
Sportspeople from Kingston, Jamaica
20th-century Jamaican people